1916 in philosophy

Events

Publications 
 R. G. Collingwood, Religion and Philosophy
 John Dewey, Democracy and Education: An Introduction to the Philosophy of Education
 Emma Goldman, "The Philosophy of Atheism", Mother Earth X:12 (February)

Births 
 March 4 - Hans Eysenck, German-born psychologist (d. 1997)
 March 29 - Peter Geach, English philosopher (d. 2013)
 June 14 - Georg Henrik von Wright, Finnish philosopher (d. 2003)

Deaths 
 February 19 - Ernst Mach, Austrian physicist and philosopher (b. 1838)
 September 14 - Pierre Duhem, French philosopher of science (b. 1861)

References 

Philosophy
20th-century philosophy
Philosophy by year